Aborichthys rosammai is a species of stone loach from India.

References

Nemacheilidae
Fish of Asia
Freshwater fish of India
Taxa named by Nibedita Sen (scientist)
Fish described in 2009